Martin Craig Jones (born 8 November 1985) Also known as Martin Olson Jones is an English cricketer.  Jones is a right-handed batsman who bowls right-arm medium-fast.  He was born in Bristol.

While studying for his degree at Durham University, Jones made a single first-class appearance for Durham UCCE against Nottinghamshire in 2006.  In this match, he was dismissed in the university's only innings for a single run by Ian Salisbury.  He also bowled a total of 16 wicket-less overs in this match.

References

External links
Martin Jones at ESPNcricinfo
Martin Jones at CricketArchive

1985 births
Living people
Cricketers from Bristol
Alumni of Durham University
English cricketers
Durham MCCU cricketers